The canton of Mélisey is an administrative division of the Haute-Saône department, northeastern France. Its borders were modified at the French canton reorganisation which came into effect in March 2015. Its seat is in Mélisey.

It consists of the following communes:
 
Amage
Amont-et-Effreney
Belfahy
Belmont
Belonchamp
Beulotte-Saint-Laurent
Breuchotte
La Bruyère
La Corbière
Corravillers
Écromagny
Esmoulières
Faucogney-et-la-Mer
Les Fessey
Fresse
Haut-du-Them-Château-Lambert
Lantenot
La Lanterne-et-les-Armonts
La Longine
Magnivray
Mélisey
La Montagne
Montessaux
La Proiselière-et-Langle
Raddon-et-Chapendu
Rignovelle
La Rosière
Saint-Barthélemy
Saint-Bresson
Sainte-Marie-en-Chanois
Servance-Miellin
Ternuay-Melay-et-Saint-Hilaire
La Voivre

References

Cantons of Haute-Saône